Joseph Lister (1827–1912) was a British surgeon and pioneer of antiseptic surgery.

Joseph Lister may also refer to:

Joseph Jackson Lister (1786–1869), his father, amateur British opticist and physicist
Joseph Jackson Lister (naturalist) (1857–1927), British zoologist and plant collector
Joseph Lister (VC) (1886–1963), sergeant in the British Army and recipient of the Victoria Cross
Joseph Lister (cricketer) (1930–1991), cricketer
Joseph Storr Lister (1852–1927), South African forester

See also
Lister (surname)